Holly Karrol Clark (born January 19, 1979) is an American actress, model, writer and television producer from Windham, New Hampshire (USA).

After attending Emerson College in Boston, she transferred to USC in 1996 and began her career in television and commercials with her debut on The Jenny McCarthy Show.

She continued her acting training with such well-known coaches as Diane Salinger, Rick Walters and Candace Silvers.

Filmography
What Doesn't Kill You (2008) – Kim
Seducing Mr. Perfect (2006) – Jennifer
The Young the Gay and the Restless (2005) – Cynthia
Headshots (2005)
3:52 (2005) – Lisa

Television work
In Justice (2005) – O'Brian's Wife
Cheating Hearts (2005) – Sophie (pilot)
The DL Chronicles (2005) – Tanya
The Collectors (2005) – Paula
Tom Clancy's "NetForce" (1999) - FBGSo You Want To Work With Animals (co-host)Days of Our Lives – KarenThe Jenny McCarthy Show – Jenny's FriendNorth Mission Road'' – Pamela Cummings

External links
 Official Website
 
 Holly Karrol Clark at MySpace

Emerson College alumni
American film actresses
American television actresses
Living people
People from Windham, New Hampshire
1979 births
21st-century American women